Żabikowo () is a formerly independent village and now one of three city districts of Luboń, however without an administrative function.

History

The oldest known mention of Żabikowo dates back to 1283. Żabikowo was a private church village, administratively located in the Poznań County in the Poznań Voivodeship in the Greater Poland Province of the Kingdom of Poland. It was annexed by Prussia in the Second Partition of Poland in 1793. In 1807, it was regained by Poles and included within the short-lived Duchy of Warsaw. After the duchy's dissolution in 1815, it was reannexed by Prussia, and from 1871 it was also part of Germany. In 1870, a College of Agriculture (Wyższa Szkoła Rolnicza) was established in Żabikowo, as a Polish college, and was forced to close in 1876 as a result of anti-Polish policies of the German authorities. Following World War I, Poland regained independence and control of the village.

During the Nazi occupation in World War II the Germans established a forced labour camp for Jews called Poggenburg. In 1943–1945 Żabikowo was also the site of a Nazi prison camp, which replaced the Fort VII camp in western Poznań, and in which over 20,000 people were imprisoned. The prisoners were mainly members of the Polish resistance movement, but also Luxembourgers, Dutch, Hungarians, Slovaks, Americans, Soviet prisoners of war and deserters from the Wehrmacht. Prisoners were subjected to inhuman living conditions, torture and executions. There is now a museum and a monument entitled Nigdy wojny ("Never War") by Józef Gosławski, as well other monuments to various people imprisoned and murdered in the camp.

It was given town rights and incorporated into the newly created town of Luboń on 13 November 1954.

References

Luboń
Neighbourhoods in Poland